Kel Gres is a tribal confederation of Tuareg clans (or "Drum-groups"). In the modern era, they have mostly lived in south central Niger, although they are known to have inhabited the Aïr Mountains prior to the 17th century. As pastoralists, the Kel Gress also have a tradition seasonal transhumance cycle which takes them far from their more settled communities in the Zinder and Tahoua Regions.

See also
Tuareg
Kel Adagh
Kel Ahaggar
Kel Ajjer
Kel Ayr
Kel Owey
Aulliminden: Kel Ataram (west) and Kel Dinnik (east)

References

Portions of this article were translated from the French language Wikipedia article :fr:Kel Gress, 2008-08-26.

Tuareg confederations
Ethnic groups in Niger